The Harbour Bride (German: Die Hafenbraut) is a 1927 German silent drama film directed by Wolfgang Neff and starring John Mylong, Olga Engl and Robert Leffler.

The film's sets were designed by the art director Artur Günther.

Cast
 Alice Kempen
 John Mylong
 Olga Engl
 Robert Leffler
 Bobbie Bender

References

Bibliography
 Alfred Krautz. International directory of cinematographers, set- and costume designers in film, Volume 4. Saur, 1984.

External links

1927 films
Films of the Weimar Republic
German silent feature films
German black-and-white films
Films directed by Wolfgang Neff